Luzhin is a Russian family name, derived from the word luzha, "puddle". Its feminine counterpart is Luzhina. It may refer to:

Fyodor Luzhin (died 1727), Russian geodesist and cartographer
Luzhin Strait within Kuril Islands, named after Fyodor Luzhin
Larisa Luzhina (born 1939), Russian actress

See also
The Luzhin Defence